Zhuikha is a rural locality (a village) in Vtorovskoye Rural Settlement, Kameshkovsky District, Vladimir Oblast, Russia. The population was 15 as of 2010.

Geography 
Zhuikha is located 28 km southwest of Kameshkovo (the district's administrative centre) by road. Aksentsevo is the nearest rural locality.

References 

Rural localities in Kameshkovsky District